S.V. Real Saramacca is a Surinamese football club based in Saramacca District, Suriname. They compete in the Surinamese Eerste Klasse, the second-tier of Surinamese football. The team have previously played in the Hoofdklasse, the top-tier of football in Suriname.

References

Real Saramacca
Football clubs in Groningen, Suriname